The 2021–22 season was Kalamata Football Club's 54th in existence and the club's first season in Super League Greece 2 , the second level in Greek football, after the 2009-2010 season , when Kalamata was relegated to the amateur leagues .

Transfers

Transfers in

Transfers out

2021-2022 squad

Pre-season and friendlies
Kalamata's pre-season began on the 2nd of August at Paliambela training ground. From 9 to 22 August Kalamata was training at Portaria were the first friendly of the pre-season against Olympiakos Volou took place. Kalamata won 4-0 with M.Markovski and T.Tselepidis scoring in the first half and new signings G.Loukinas and M.Asamoah scoring in the second.

Greek Cup

Championship

Goalscorers

References 

Kalamata F.C. seasons
Kalamata